In graph theory, the unproven Erdős–Gyárfás conjecture, made in 1995 by the prolific mathematician Paul Erdős and his collaborator András Gyárfás, states that every graph with minimum degree 3 contains a simple cycle whose length is a power of two. Erdős offered a prize of $100 for proving the conjecture, or $50 for a counterexample; it is one of many conjectures of Erdős.

If the conjecture is false, a counterexample would take the form of a graph with minimum degree three having no power-of-two cycles. It is known through computer searches of Gordon Royle and Klas Markström that any counterexample must have at least 17 vertices, and any cubic counterexample must have at least 30 vertices. Markström's searches found four graphs on 24 vertices in which the only power-of-two cycles have 16 vertices. One of these four graphs is planar; however, the Erdős–Gyárfás conjecture is now known to be true for the special case of 3-connected cubic planar graphs 

Weaker results relating the degree of a graph to unavoidable sets of cycle lengths are known: there is a set S of lengths, with |S| = O(n0.99), such that every graph with average degree ten or more contains a cycle with its length in S , and every graph whose average degree is exponential in the iterated logarithm of n necessarily contains a cycle whose length is a power of two . The conjecture is also known to be true for planar claw-free graphs  and for graphs that avoid large induced stars and satisfy additional constraints on their degrees .

References
.
.
.

.
.

External links
Exoo, Geoffrey, Graphs Without Cycles of Specified Lengths
West, Douglas B., Erdős Gyárfás Conjecture on 2-power Cycle Lengths, Open Problems - Graph Theory and Combinatorics

Conjectures
Unsolved problems in graph theory
Gyarfas conjecture